Winchester Township is one of the fifteen townships of Adams County, Ohio, United States. The 2010 census found 2,208 people in the township, 1,157 of whom lived in the unincorporated portions of the township.

Geography
Located in the northwestern corner of the county, it borders the following townships:
Concord Township, Highland County - north
Scott Township - east
Wayne Township - south
Jackson Township, Brown County - southwest
Eagle Township, Brown County - northwest

The village of Winchester is located in western Winchester Township.

Name and history
Winchester Township was organized in 1838. It is the only Winchester Township statewide.

Government
The township is governed by a three-member board of trustees, who are elected in November of odd-numbered years to a four-year term beginning on the following January 1. Two are elected in the year after the presidential election and one is elected in the year before it. There is also an elected township fiscal officer, who serves a four-year term beginning on April 1 of the year after the election, which is held in November of the year before the presidential election. Vacancies in the fiscal officership or on the board of trustees are filled by the remaining trustees.

References

External links
County website

Townships in Adams County, Ohio
1838 establishments in Ohio
Populated places established in 1838
Townships in Ohio